Thorpe on the Hill is a small village and civil parish in North Kesteven, Lincolnshire, England.

Location

Population
In the 2001 census the parish population was 530, increasing to 558 at the 2011 census.

Industries
Local commerce and industry includes the door manufacturer Doortechnik.

Transportation
Thorpe-on-the-Hill railway station, on the Nottingham to Lincoln Line north of the village, was opened in 1846; it closed in 1955.

References

External links

Villages in Lincolnshire
Civil parishes in Lincolnshire
North Kesteven District